American Crow Creek is a stream in the U.S. state of South Dakota.

According to tradition, American Crow Creek received its name directly from Lewis and Clark.

See also
List of rivers of South Dakota

References

Rivers of Lyman County, South Dakota
Rivers of South Dakota